Deividas Kumelis (born April 6, 1995) is a Lithuanian professional basketball player for Apollo Amsterdam of the BNXT League. Kumelis has played in Lithuania, Portugal and the Netherlands over his career.

Early life
Kumelis started playing basketball at age 7 at the Šarūnas Marčiulionis Basketball Academy.

Professional career
On September 28, 2017, Kumelis signed with Aris Leeuwarden of the Dutch Basketball League (DBL). In his debut on October 8, Kumelis recorded 19 points and 7 assists in an 80–96 win over BAL. He averaged 7.9 points, 2.8 rebounds and 4.3 assists in his debut season in the DBL. On August 1, 2018, he re-signed for another year with Aris. He averaged 5.6 points, 2 rebounds and 3.5 assists in the 2018–19 season.

In the 2019–20 season he played for both BC Lūšis and BC Mažeikiai of the Lithuanian National Basketball League (NKL).

On 2 October 2020, Kumelis was announced by The Hague Royals, newcomer in the Dutch Basketball League. On 27 March 2021, Kumelis scored a career-high 42 points in a 77–76 win over BAL. On 16 June, he extended his contract with one more season.

On August 22, 2022, he has signed with Apollo Amsterdam of the BNXT League.

International career
Kumelis played with the Lithuanian national basketball team U20 team at the 2015 FIBA Europe Under-20 Championship, where the country finished in 7th place.

References

1995 births
Living people
Apollo Amsterdam players
Aris Leeuwarden players
BC Mažeikiai players
BC Nevėžis players
BC Lūšis players
CAB Madeira players
Dutch Basketball League players
Lithuanian men's basketball players
Point guards
The Hague Royals players